"I Can Do That" is the second single released from Montell Jordan's third album, Let's Ride. Produced by Teddy Bishop, the song became the album's second consecutive hit, peaking at 14 on the Billboard Hot 100. It was certified gold by the RIAA for sales of 500,000 copies, becoming his final single to achieve that feat. The "I Can Do That" single was released with three remixes of his previous single, "Let's Ride".

Single track listing

A-Side
"I Can Do That" (Radio Edit)    
"Let's Ride" (Dutch Factory Remix)    
"Let's Ride" (Dave Mazee's Wicked Mix)    
"Let's Ride" (Super Jupiter Lectro Mix)

B-Side
"I Can Do That" (Instrumental)    
"Let's Ride" (Dutch Factory Remix) (TV track)    
"Let's Ride" (Dave Mazee's Wicked Mix) (TV Track)    
"Let's Ride" (Super Jupiter Lectro Mix) (Instrumental)

Charts and certifications

Weekly charts

Year-end charts

Certifications

|}

References

1998 singles
1998 songs
Montell Jordan songs
Def Jam Recordings singles
Songs written by Montell Jordan